Omocyrius is a genus of longhorn beetles of the subfamily Lamiinae, containing the following species:

 Omocyrius fulvisparsus Pascoe, 1866
 Omocyrius jansoni Ritsema, 1888

References

Lamiinae